Solari is an Italian surname. Notable people with the surname include:

 Andrea Solari (c. 1460–1524), Italian painter
 Augusto Solari (born 1992), Argentine football player
 Benjamin Solari Parravicini (c. 1898–1974), Argentine painter
 Cristoforo Solari (c. 1460–1527), Italian architect and sculptor
 Esteban Solari (born 1980), Argentine football player
 Giovanni Solari (1400–1482), Italian architect, son of Marco Solari
 Guiniforte Solari (1429–1481), Italian architect
 Jorge Solari (born 1941), football manager
 Laura Solari (1913–1984), Italian film actress
 Malucha Solari (1920–2005), Nicaraguan-Chilean ballerina and choreographer
 Marco Solari (1355–1405), Italian architect
 Pietro Antonio Solari (died 1493), Italian architect
 Santiago Solari (born 1976), Argentine football player
 Santino Solari (1576–1646), Italian architect and sculptor
Raymond Louis Solari (born 1928) American football coach

See also 
 Paolo Soleri (1919–2013), Italian-American architect
 Solari (disambiguation)

Italian-language surnames